Calathus peltatus is a species of ground beetle from the Platyninae subfamily that can be found in southern part of Russia and East Palaearctic.

References

peltatus
Beetles described in 1845
Beetles of Europe
Taxa named by Friedrich August Rudolph Kolenati